The Santa Rosa Arch, also known as the Bantayang Bato, is a monument in the city of Santa Rosa in Laguna, Philippines.

History
The original structure was built between 1859 and 1860 and was patterned after the Arc de Triomphe in Paris, France. It was commissioned to be built by Arcadio Arambulo.

It was built as a replacement to an old guard tower which was used by the Spanish colonial authorities to guard the then-town from bandits. The current structure was erected in 1925 during the tenure of Municipal President Jose Zavalla.

Local sculptor David Diaz was commissioned to renovate the arch in 1931. Since the 1931 renovation, the arch exhibits Art Deco characteristics.

Features
The monument features four lion sculptures which is symbolically meant to be the guardians of Santa Rosa. These features is the origin of Santa Rosa's title as the "Lion City of South Luzon". The arch also had a structured staircase, a sunburst design on its alcove, and a grand lady flaming torch and features a wraparound balcony. It also exhibits frieze and a relief of trumpeting angels.

Cultural significance

The Santa Rosa Arch is considered as a primary landmark of Santa Rosa serving as a gateway to the city. The monument is also a central element of the city seal of Santa Rosa.

References

Buildings and structures completed in 1860
Monuments and memorials in the Philippines
Triumphal arches in the Philippines
Buildings and structures in Santa Rosa, Laguna
19th-century architecture in the Philippines